Fußball-Club Bayern München e. V. (FCB), also known as FC Bayern, Bayern Munich, or simply Bayern, is a German professional sports club based in Munich, Bavaria. It is best known for its professional men's football team, which plays in the Bundesliga, the top tier of the German football league system. Bayern is the most successful club in German football history, having won a record 32 national titles, including 10 consecutively since 2013, and 20 national cups, along with numerous European honours.

FC Bayern Munich was founded in 1900 by 11 football players, led by Franz John. Although Bayern won its first national championship in 1932, the club was not selected for the Bundesliga at its inception in 1963. The club had its period of greatest success in the mid-1970s when, under the captaincy of Franz Beckenbauer, it won the European Cup three consecutive times (1974–1976). Overall, Bayern have won six European Cup/UEFA Champions League titles (a German record), winning their sixth title in the 2020 final as part of  the  Treble, after which it became only the second European club to achieve the feat twice. Bayern has also won one UEFA Cup, one European Cup Winners' Cup, two UEFA Super Cups, two FIFA Club World Cups and two Intercontinental Cups, making it one of the most successful European clubs internationally and the only German club to have won both international titles. Bayern players have accumulated five Ballon d'Or awards, two The Best FIFA Men's Player awards, four European Golden Shoe, and three UEFA Men's Player of the Year awards including UEFA Club Footballer of the Year.

By winning the 2020 FIFA Club World Cup, Bayern Munich became only the second club to win the "sextuple" (winning the League, Cup, and Champions League in one season followed by the Domestic Supercup, UEFA Supercup, and Club World Cup in the next season) or all trophies that a club competes for in a given calendar year. Bayern Munich are one of five clubs to have won all three of UEFA's main club competitions, the only German club to achieve that. As of May 2022, Bayern Munich are ranked first in UEFA club rankings. The club has traditional local rivalries with 1860 Munich and 1. FC Nürnberg, as well as with Borussia Dortmund since the mid-1990s.

Since the beginning of the 2005–06 season, Bayern has played its home games at the Allianz Arena. Previously the team had played at Munich's Olympiastadion for 33 years. The team colours are red and white, and the crest shows the white and blue flag of Bavaria. In terms of revenue, Bayern Munich is the largest sports club in Germany and the third highest-earning football club in the world, behind FC Barcelona and Real Madrid, with a value of €634.1 million in 2021. In November 2019, Bayern had 293,000 official members and 4,499 officially registered fan clubs with over 350,000 members. The club has other departments for chess, handball, basketball, gymnastics, bowling, table tennis and senior football with more than 1,100 active members.

History

Early years (1900–1965)

FC Bayern Munich was founded by members of a Munich gymnastics club (MTV 1879). When a congregation of members of MTV 1879 decided on 27 February 1900 that the footballers of the club would not be allowed to join the German Football Association (DFB), 11 members of the football division left the congregation and on the same evening founded Fußball-Club Bayern München. Within a few months, Bayern achieved high-scoring victories against all local rivals, including a 15–0 win against FC Nordstern, and reached the semi-finals of the 1900–01 South German championship. In the following years, the club won some local trophies and in 1910–11 Bayern joined the newly founded "Kreisliga", the first regional Bavarian league. The club won this league in its first year, but did not win it again until the beginning of the First World War in 1914, which halted all football activities in Germany. By the end of its first decade of founding, Bayern had attracted its first German national team player, Max Gaberl Gablonsky. By 1920, it had over 700 members, making it the largest football club in Munich.

In the years after the war, Bayern won several regional competitions before winning its first South German championship in 1926, an achievement repeated two years later. Its first national title was gained in 1932, when coach Richard "Little Dombi" Kohn led the team to the German championship by defeating Eintracht Frankfurt 2–0 in the final.

The rise of Adolf Hitler to power put an abrupt end to Bayern's development. Club president Kurt Landauer and the coach, both of whom were Jewish, left the country. Many others in the club were also purged. Bayern was taunted as the "Jew's club" while local rival 1860 Munich gained much support. Josef Sauter, who was inaugurated in 1943, was the only NSDAP member as president. After a friendly match in Switzerland, some Bayern players greeted Landauer, who was a spectator, and the club was subject to continued discrimination. Bayern was also affected by the ruling that football players had to be full amateurs again, which led to the move of the gifted young centre-forward Oskar Rohr to Switzerland. In the following years, Bayern could not sustain its role of contender for the national title, achieving mid-table results in its regional league instead.

After the end of the Second World War in 1945, Bayern became a member of the Oberliga Süd, the southern conference of the German first division, which was split five ways at that time. Bayern struggled, hiring and firing 13 coaches between 1945 and 1963. Landauer returned from exile in 1947 and was once again appointed club president, the tenure lasted until 1951. He remains as the club's president with the longest accumulated tenure. Landauer has been deemed as inventor of Bayern as a professional club and his memory is being upheld by the Bayern ultras Schickeria. In 1955, the club was relegated but returned to the Oberliga in the following season and won the DFB-Pokal for the first time, beating Fortuna Düsseldorf 1–0 in the final.

The club struggled financially, though, verging on bankruptcy at the end of the 1950s. Manufacturer ousted president Reitlinger, who was later convicted for financial irregularities, was ousted in the elections of 1958 by the industrialist Roland Endler.  He provided financial stability for the club. Under his reign, Bayern had its best years in the Oberliga. Endler was no longer a candidate in 1962, when Wilhelm Neudecker, who became wealthy in the postwar construction boom, replaced him.

In 1963, the Oberligas in Germany were consolidated into one national league, the Bundesliga. Five teams from the Oberliga South were admitted. The key for qualifying for the Bundesliga was the accumulated record of the last twelve years, where Bayern was only the sixth-ranked club. To boot, local rivals TSV 1860 Munich, ranked seventh, were champions of the last Oberliga-Süd season and were given preference on the basis of this achievement. After initial protests of Bayern for alleged mistreatment remained fruitless, president Neudecker rose to the challenge and hired Zlatko Čajkovski, who in 1962 led 1. FC Köln to the national championship. Fielding a team with young talents like Franz Beckenbauer, Gerd Müller and Sepp Maier – who would later be collectively referred to as the axis, they achieved promotion to the Bundesliga in 1965.

The golden years (1965–1979)

In their first Bundesliga season, Bayern finished third and also won the DFB-Pokal. This qualified them for the following year's European Cup Winners' Cup, which they won in a dramatic final against Scottish club Rangers, when Franz Roth scored the decider in a 1–0 extra time victory. In 1967, Bayern retained the DFB-Pokal, but slow overall progress saw Branko Zebec take over as coach. He replaced Bayern's offensive style of play with a more disciplined approach, and in doing so achieved the first league and cup double in Bundesliga history in 1969. Bayern Munich are one of four German clubs to win the Bundesliga and DFB-Pokal in the same season along with Borussia Dortmund, 1. FC Köln and Werder Bremen. Zebec used only 13 players throughout the season.

Udo Lattek took charge in 1970. After winning the DFB-Pokal in his first season, Lattek led Bayern to their third German championship. The deciding match in the 1971–72 season against Schalke 04 was the first match in the new Olympiastadion, and was also the first live televised match in Bundesliga history. Bayern beat Schalke 5–1 and thus claimed the title, also setting several records, including points gained and goals scored. Bayern also won the next two championships, but the zenith was their triumph in the 1974 European Cup Final against Atlético Madrid, which Bayern won 4–0 after a replay. This title – after winning the Cup Winners' trophy 1967 and two semi-finals (1968 and 1972) in that competition – marked the club's breakthrough as a force on the international stage.

During the following years, the team was unsuccessful domestically but defended their European title by defeating Leeds United in the 1975 European Cup Final when Roth and Müller secured victory with late goals. "We came back into the game and scored two lucky goals, so in the end, we were the winners, but we were very, very lucky", stated Franz Beckenbauer. Billy Bremner believed the French referee was "very suspicious". Leeds fans then rioted in Paris and were banned from European football for three years. A year later in Glasgow, Saint-Étienne were defeated by another Roth goal and Bayern became the third club to win the trophy in three consecutive years. The final trophy won by Bayern in this era was the Intercontinental Cup, in which they defeated Brazilian club Cruzeiro over two legs. The rest of the decade was a time of change and saw no further titles for Bayern. In 1977, Franz Beckenbauer left for New York Cosmos and, in 1979, Sepp Maier and Uli Hoeneß retired while Gerd Müller joined the Fort Lauderdale Strikers. Bayerndusel was coined during this period as an expression of either contempt or envy about the sometimes narrow and last-minute wins against other teams.

From FC Breitnigge to FC Hollywood (1979–1998)
The 1980s were a period of off-field turmoil for Bayern, with many changes in personnel and financial problems. On the field, Paul Breitner and Karl-Heinz Rummenigge, termed FC Breitnigge, led the team to Bundesliga titles in 1980 and 1981. Apart from a DFB-Pokal win in 1982, two relatively unsuccessful seasons followed, after which Breitner retired, and former coach Udo Lattek returned. Bayern won the DFB-Pokal in 1984 and went on to win five Bundesliga championships in six seasons, including a double in 1986. European success, however, was elusive during the decade; Bayern managed to claim the runners-up spot in the European Cup in 1982 and 1987.

Jupp Heynckes was hired as coach in 1987, but after two consecutive championships in 1988–89 and 1989–90, Bayern's form dipped. After finishing second in 1990–91, the club finished just five points above the relegation places in 1991–92. In 1993–94, Bayern was eliminated in the UEFA Cup second round to Premier League side Norwich City, who remain the only English club to beat Bayern at the Olympiastadion. Success returned when Franz Beckenbauer took over for the second half of the 1993–94 season, winning the championship again after a four-year gap. Beckenbauer was then appointed club president.

His successors as coach, Giovanni Trapattoni and Otto Rehhagel, both finished trophyless after a season, not meeting the club's high expectations. During this time, Bayern's players frequently appeared in the gossip pages of the press rather than the sports pages, resulting in the nickname FC Hollywood. Franz Beckenbauer briefly returned at the end of the 1995–96 season as caretaker coach and led his team to victory in the UEFA Cup, beating Bordeaux in the final. For the 1996–97 season, Trapattoni returned to win the championship. In the following season, Bayern lost the title to newly promoted 1. FC Kaiserslautern and Trapattoni had to take his leave for the second time.

Renewed international success (1998–2007)

After his success at Borussia Dortmund, Bayern were coached by Ottmar Hitzfeld from 1998 to 2004. In Hitzfeld's first season, Bayern won the Bundesliga and came close to winning the Champions League, losing 2–1 to Manchester United into injury time after leading for most of the match. The following year, in the club's centenary season, Bayern won the third league and cup double in its history. A third consecutive Bundesliga title followed in 2001, won with a stoppage time goal on the final day of the league season. Days later, Bayern won the Champions League for the fourth time after a 25-year gap, defeating Valencia on penalties. The 2001–02 season began with a win in the Intercontinental Cup, but ended trophyless otherwise. In 2002–03, Bayern won their fourth double, leading the league by a record margin of 16 points. Hitzfeld's reign ended in 2004, with Bayern underperforming, including defeat by second division Alemannia Aachen in the DFB-Pokal.

Felix Magath took over and led Bayern to two consecutive doubles. Prior to the start of the 2005–06 season, Bayern moved from the Olympiastadion to the new Allianz Arena, which the club shared with 1860 Munich. On the field, their performance in 2006–07 was erratic. Trailing in the league and having lost to Alemannia Aachen in the cup yet again, coach Magath was sacked shortly after the winter break.

Hitzfeld returned as a trainer in January 2007, but Bayern finished the 2006–07 season in fourth position, thus failing to qualify for the Champions League for the first time in more than a decade. Additional losses in the DFB-Pokal and the DFB-Ligapokal left the club with no honours for the season.

Robbery – Robben and Ribery (2007–2019)
For the 2007–08 season, Bayern made drastic squad changes to help rebuild. They signed a total of eight new players and sold, released or loaned out nine of their players. Among new signings were 2006 World Cup stars such as Franck Ribéry, Miroslav Klose and Luca Toni. Bayern went on to win the Bundesliga in convincing fashion, leading the standings on every single week of play, and the DFB-Pokal against Borussia Dortmund.

After the season, Bayern's long-term goalkeeper Oliver Kahn retired, which left the club without a top-tier goalkeeper for several seasons. The club's coach Ottmar Hitzfeld also retired and Jürgen Klinsmann was chosen as his successor. However, Klinsmann was sacked even before the end of his first season as Bayern trailed Wolfsburg in the league, had lost the quarterfinal of the DFB-Pokal to Bayer Leverkusen, and had been made look silly in the quarterfinal of the Champions League when FC Barcelona scored four times in the first half of the first leg and over the course of both legs Bayern never looked like they could keep up. Jupp Heynckes was named caretaker coach and led the club to a second-place finish in the league.

For the 2009–10 season, Bayern hired Dutch manager Louis van Gaal, and Dutch forward Arjen Robben joined Bayern. Robben, alongside Ribéry, would go on to shape Bayern's playstyle of attacking over the wings for the next ten years. The press quickly dubbed the duo "Robbery". In addition, David Alaba and Thomas Müller were promoted to the first team. With Müller, van Gaal went so far as to proclaim, "With me, Müller always plays," which has become a much-referenced phrase over the years. On the pitch Bayern had its most successful season since 2001, securing the domestic double and losing only in the final of the Champions League to Inter Milan 0–2. Despite the successful 2009–10 campaign, van Gaal was fired in April 2011 as Bayern was trailing in the league and eliminated in the first knockout round of the Champions League, again by Inter. Van Gaal's second in command, Andries Jonker, took over and finished the season in third place.

Jupp Heynckes returned for his second permanent spell in the 2011–12 season. Although the club had signed Manuel Neuer, ending Bayern's quest for an adequate substitute for Kahn, and Jérôme Boateng for the season, Bayern remained without a title for the second consecutive season, coming in second to Borussia Dortmund in the league and the cup. The Champions League final was held at the Allianz and Bayern indeed reached the final in their home stadium but lost the "Finale dahoam" as they had termed it to Chelsea on penalties. For the 2012–13 season, Bayern signed Javi Martínez. After Bayern had finished as runner-up to all titles in 2011–12, Bayern went on to win all titles in 2012–13, setting various Bundesliga records along the way, and becoming the first German team to win the treble. Bayern finished the Bundesliga on 91 points, only 11 points shy of a perfect season, and to date, still, the best season ever played. In what was Bayern's third Champions League final appearance within four years, they beat Borussia Dortmund 2–1. A week later, they completed the treble by winning the DFB-Pokal final over VfB Stuttgart. During the season, in January, Bayern had already announced that they would hire Pep Guardiola as coach for the 2013–14 season. Originally the club presented this as Heynckes retiring on the expiration of his contract, but Uli Hoeneß later admitted that it was not Heynckes's decision to leave Bayern at the end of the season. It was actually forced by the club's desire to appoint Guardiola.

Bayern fulfilled Guardiola's wish of signing Thiago Alcântara from FC Barcelona and Guardiola's first season started off well with Bayern extending a streak of undefeated league matches from the last season to 53 matches. The eventual loss to Augsburg came two match days after Bayern had already claimed the league title. During the season, Bayern had also claimed two other titles, the FIFA Club World Cup and the UEFA Super Cup, the latter being the last major trophy the club had not yet won. Bayern also won the cup to complete their tenth domestic double, but lost in the semi-final of the Champions League to Real Madrid. Off the pitch, Bayern's president Uli Hoeneß was convicted of tax evasion on 13 March 2014 and sentenced to three and a half years in prison. Hoeneß resigned the next day. Vice-president Karl Hopfner was elected president on 2 May. Before the 2014–15 season, Bayern picked up Robert Lewandowski after his contract had ended at Borussia Dortmund, and loaned out Xabi Alonso from Real Madrid. Bayern also let Toni Kroos leave for Real. Club icons Bastian Schweinsteiger and Claudio Pizarro left before the 2015–16 season. In these two seasons, Bayern defended their league title, including another double in 2015–16, but failed to advance past the semi-finals in the Champions League. Although the club's leadership tried to convince Guardiola to stay, the coach decided not to extend his three-year contract.

Carlo Ancelotti was hired as successor to Guardiola. The key transfer for the 2016–17 campaign was Mats Hummels from Borussia Dortmund. Off the pitch Uli Hoeneß had been released early from prison and reelected as president in November 2016. Under Ancelotti, Bayern claimed their fifth consecutive league title, but did not win the cup or the Champions League. In July 2017, Bayern announced that 1860 Munich would leave the Allianz for good as the club had been relegated to the 4th division. Before the 2017–18 season, Bayern made extensive changes to their squad, signing amongst others young prospects such as Kingsley Coman, Corentin Tolisso, Serge Gnabry and Niklas Süle, and loaning James Rodríguez from Real. Meanwhile, the club's captain, Philipp Lahm, and Xabi Alonso retired, and several other players left the club. As Bayern's performances were perceived to be increasingly lacklustre, Ancelotti was sacked after a 0–3 loss to Paris St. Germain in the Champions League, early in his second season. Willy Sagnol took over as interim manager for a week before it was announced that Jupp Heynckes would finish the season in his fourth spell at the club. During the season, the club urged Heynckes —even publicly— to extend his contract, but Heynckes, aged 73, stayed firm that he would retire for good after the season. The club began a long and extensive search to find a replacement, and eventually Niko Kovač was presented as Heynckes's successor, signing a three-year contract. Heynckes led the club to another championship. In the cup final, Heynckes's last match as coach, Heynckes met his successor on the pitch. Kovač's Eintracht Frankfurt denied Bayern the title, winning 3–1.

Kovač's first season at the club started slowly, with Bayern falling behind Dortmund in the league throughout the first half of the season. In contrast to similar situations with van Gaal and Ancelotti, the club's leadership decided to protect their coach from criticisms. However, after the winter break, Bayern quickly closed the distance and put themselves first-place in the league. In the Champions League, the club was eliminated by Liverpool in the round of 16, the first time since 2011 that Bayern did not reach the quarterfinal. During the season Arjen Robben announced that it would be his last season for the club, while Uli Hoeneß announced that Franck Ribéry would be leaving at the end of the season. In March 2019, Bayern announced that they had signed Lucas Hernandez from Atlético Madrid for a club and Bundesliga record fee of €80 million. On 18 May 2019, Bayern won their seventh straight Bundesliga title as they finished two points above second-place Dortmund with 78 points. This Bundesliga title was Ribéry's ninth and Robben's eighth. A week later, Bayern defeated RB Leipzig 3–0 in the 2019 DFB-Pokal Final. With the win, Bayern won their 19th German Cup and completed their 12th domestic double.

Flick era (2019–2021)
Hansi Flick joined Bayern Munich on 1 July 2019 as an assistant coach. Under Kovač, Bayern was off to a slow start in the league and after a 5–1 loss to Frankfurt, Kovač and Bayern parted ways on 3 November 2019 with Flick being promoted to interim manager. After a satisfying spell as interim coach, Bayern announced on 22 December 2019 that Flick would remain in charge until the end of season. Bayern's performances on the pitch picked up noticeably and in April 2020, the club agreed with Flick to a new permanent contract through 2023. Under Flick the club won the league, having played the most successful leg of a Bundesliga season in history, and went on to claim the cup, thus completing the club's 13th domestic double. In the Champions League, Bayern reached their first final since 2013, en route beating FC Barcelona 8–2 in the quarter-finals and Lyon 3–0 in the semi-final. In the final, which was held in Lisbon behind closed doors due to the severity of COVID-19 pandemic, they defeated Paris Saint-Germain 1–0. Former PSG player Kingsley Coman scored the only goal of the match. With the victory, they became the second European club to complete the seasonal treble in two different seasons, matching the 2014–15 FC Barcelona team.

After a short break, Bayern started the new season by winning the UEFA Super Cup for the second time in their history. In a closely contested match, Bayern defeated Sevilla 2–1 after extra time, with Javi Martínez scoring the winning goal. On 30 September 2020, they won the 2020 DFL-Supercup after defeating the runners-up of the Bundesliga Dortmund 3–2. In February 2021, they won the 2020 FIFA Club World Cup (postponed from December 2020 due to the COVID-19 pandemic) after defeating African champions Al Ahly SC 2–0 by a brace from Robert Lewandowski, and then winning in the final against Mexican team Tigres UANL 1–0 after a goal from Benjamin Pavard and became only the second club to win the sextuple, after Barcelona won it in 2009. Later, Bayern failed to defend its Champions League title, losing to PSG in the quarter-finals on away goals following a 3–3 aggregate draw. However, it managed to win its 9th Bundesliga title in a row. During the season, Robert Lewandowski broke Gerd Müller's record for the number of goals scored in a Bundesliga season after scoring 41 times.

On 27 April 2021, Bayern announced that Flick would be leaving at the end of the season, at his request, and that RB Leipzig manager Julian Nagelsmann would become the new manager, effective 1 July. According to multiple reports, Bayern paid Leipzig €25m, a world record for a manager, as compensation for Nagelsmann's services. It was later announced that Flick was leaving to take charge of the German national team of which he had previously been the assistant coach under manager Joachim Löw.

Nagelsmann era (2021–present)
Under new coach Julian Nagelsmann, Bayern have completed the feat of winning 10 consecutive Bundesliga titles following a 3–1 Der Klassiker win. However, the team unexpectedly lost to Villarreal in the Champions League quarter-finals, going out at that stage for the second year in a row.

Kits

In the original club constitution, Bayern's colours were named as white and blue, but the club played in white shirts with black shorts until 1905 when Bayern joined MSC. MSC decreed that the footballers would have to play in red shorts. Also, the younger players were called red shorts, which were meant as an insult. For most of the club's early history, Bayern had primarily worn white and maroon home kits. In 1968–69 season, Bayern changed to red and blue striped shirts, with blue shorts and socks. Between 1969 and 1973, the team wore a home strip of red and white striped shirts with either red or white shorts and red socks. In the 1973–74 season, the team switched to an all-white kit featuring single vertical red and blue stripes on the shirt. From 1974 onwards, Bayern has mostly worn an all-red home kit with white trim. Bayern revived the red and blue striped colour scheme between 1995 and 1997. In 1997, blue was the dominant colour for the first time when Adidas released an all navy blue home kit with a red chest band. In 1999, Bayern returned to a predominantly red kit, which featured blue sleeves, and in 2000 the club released a traditional all red kit with white trim to be worn for Champions League matches. Bayern also wore a Rotwein coloured home kits in Bundesliga matches between 2001 and 2003, and during the 2006–07 Champions League campaign, in reference to their first-choice colours prior to the late 1960s.

The club's away kit has had a wide range of colours over the years, including white, black, blue, and gold-green. Bayern also features a distinct international kit. During the 2013–14 season, Bayern used an all-red home kit with a Bavarian flag diamond watermark pattern, a Lederhosen inspired white and black Oktoberfest away kit, and an all navy blue international kit.

In the 1980s and 1990s, Bayern used a special away kit when playing at 1. FC Kaiserslautern, representing the Brazilian colours blue and yellow, a superstition borne from the fact that the club found it hard to win there.

Kit suppliers and shirt sponsors

Kit deals

Crest
Bayern's crest has changed several times. Originally it consisted of the stylised letters F, C, B, M, which were woven into one symbol. The original crest was blue. The colours of Bavaria were included for the first time in 1954. The crest from 1919 to 1924 denotes "Bayern FA", whereby "FA" stands for Fußball-Abteilung, i.e., Football Department; Bayern then was integrated into TSV Jahn Munich and constituted its football department.

The modern version of the crest has changed from the 1954 version in several steps. While the crest consisted of a single colour only for most of the time, namely blue or red, the current crest is blue, red, and white. It has the colours of Bavaria in its centre, and FC Bayern München is written in white on a red ring enclosing the Bavarian colours.

Stadiums

Bayern played its first training games at the Schyrenplatz in the centre of Munich. The first official games were held on the Theresienwiese. In 1901, Bayern moved to a field of its own, located in Schwabing at the Clemensstraße. After joining the Münchner Sport-Club (MSC) in 1906, Bayern moved in May 1907 to MSC's ground at the Leopoldstraße. As the crowds gathering for Bayern's home games increased at the beginning of the 1920s, Bayern had to switch to various other premises in Munich.

From 1925, Bayern shared the Grünwalder Stadion with 1860 Munich. Until World War II, the stadium was owned by 1860 Munich, and is still colloquially known as Sechz'ger ("Sixties") Stadium. It was destroyed during the war, and efforts to rebuild it resulted in a patchwork. Bayern's record crowd at the Grünwalder Stadion is reported as more than 50,000 in the home game against 1. FC Nürnberg in the 1961–62 season. In the Bundesliga era the stadium had a maximum capacity of 44,000 which was reached on several occasions, but the capacity has since been reduced to 21,272. As was the case at most of this period's stadiums, the vast majority of the stadium was given over to terracing. Today the second teams of both clubs play in the stadium.

For the 1972 Summer Olympics, the city of Munich built the Olympiastadion. The stadium, renowned for its architecture, was inaugurated in the last Bundesliga match of the 1971–72 season. The match drew a capacity crowd of 79,000, a total which was reached again on numerous occasions. In its early days, the stadium was considered one of the foremost stadiums in the world and played host to numerous major finals, such as that of 1974 FIFA World Cup. In the following years the stadium underwent several modifications, such as an increase in seating space from approximately 50 per cent to 66 per cent. Eventually, the stadium had a capacity of 63,000 for national matches and 59,000 for international occasions such as European Cup competitions. Many people, however, began to feel that the stadium was too cold in winter, with half the audience exposed to the weather due to lack of cover. A further complaint was the distance between the spectators and the pitch, betraying the stadium's track and field heritage. Renovation proved impossible, as the architect Günther Behnisch vetoed major modifications of the stadium.

After much discussion, the city of Munich, the state of Bavaria, Bayern Munich and 1860 Munich jointly decided at the end of 2000 to build a new stadium. While Bayern had wanted a purpose-built football stadium for several years, the awarding of the 2006 FIFA World Cup to Germany stimulated the discussion as the Olympiastadion no longer met the FIFA criteria to host a World Cup game. Located on the northern outskirts of Munich, the Allianz Arena has been in use since the beginning of the 2005–06 season. Its initial capacity of 66,000 fully covered seats has since been increased for matches on national level to 69,901 by transforming 3,000 seats to terracing in a 2:1 ratio. Since August 2012, 2,000 more seats were added in the last row of the top tier increasing the capacity to 71,000. In January 2015, a proposal to increase the capacity was approved by the city council so now Allianz Arena has a capacity of 75,000 (70,000 in Champions League).

The stadium's most prominent feature is the translucent outer layer, which can be illuminated in different colors for impressive effects. Red lighting is used for Bayern home games and white for German national team home games.

In May 2012, Bayern opened a museum about its history, FC Bayern Erlebniswelt, inside the Allianz Arena.

Supporters

At the 2018 annual general meeting, the Bayern board reported that the club had 291,000 official members and there are 4,433 officially registered fan clubs with over 390,000 members. This makes the club the largest fan membership club in the world. Bayern have fan clubs and supporters all over Germany. Bayern has an average of 75,000 attendees at the Allianz Arena which is at 100 per cent capacity level. Every Bundesliga game has been sold-out for years. Bayern's away games have been sold out for many years. According to a study by Sport+Markt Bayern is the fifth-most popular football club in Europe with 20.7 million supporters, and the most popular football club in Germany with 10 million supporters.

Bayern Munich is also renowned for its well-organised ultra scene. The most prominent groups are the Schickeria München, the Inferno Bavaria, the Red Munichs '89, the Südkurve '73, the Munichmaniacs 1996, the Red Angels, and the Red Sharks. The ultras scene of Bayern Munch has been recognised for certain groups taking stance against right-wing extremism, racism and homophobia, and in 2014 the group Schickeria München received the Julius Hirsch Award by the DFB for its commitment against antisemitism and discrimination.

FC Bayern Munich are the world's largest football club in terms of members. The Red Ladies are Bayern Munich's first and only international all-female supporter club with over 200 members. They are known for being super fans and creating a safe community for women to talk about the club.

Stern des Südens is the song which fans sing at FCB home games. In the 1990s they also used to sing FC Bayern, Forever Number One. Another notable song is Mia San Mia (Bavarian for "we are who we are") which is a famous motto of the club as well. A renowned catchphrase for the team is "Packmas" which is a Bavarian phrase for the German "Packen wir es", which means "let's do it". The team's mascot is called "Berni" since 2004.

The club also has a number of high-profile supporters, among them Pope Benedict XVI, Boris Becker, Wladimir Klitschko, Horst Seehofer and Edmund Stoiber, former Minister-President of Bavaria.

Rivalries

Bayern is one of three professional football clubs in Munich. Bayern's main local rival is 1860 Munich, who was the more successful club in the 1950s and was controversially picked for the initial Bundesliga season in 1963, winning a cup and a championship. In the 1970s and 1980s, 1860 Munich moved between the first and the third division. The Munich derby is still a much-anticipated event, getting much extra attention from supporters of both clubs. 1860 Munich is considered more working-class, and therefore suffers from a diminishing fan base in a city where the manufacturing sector is declining. Bayern is considered the establishment club, which is reflected by many board members being business leaders and including the former Bavarian minister-president, Edmund Stoiber. Despite the rivalry, Bayern has repeatedly supported 1860 in times of financial disarray.

Since the 1920s, 1. FC Nürnberg has been Bayern's main and traditional rival in Bavaria. Philipp Lahm said that playing Nürnberg is "always special" and is a "heated atmosphere". Both clubs played in the same league in the mid-1920s, but in the 1920s and 1930s, Nürnberg was far more successful, winning five championships in the 1920s, making the club Germany's record champion. Bayern took over the title more than sixty years later, when they won their tenth championship in 1987, thereby surpassing the number of championships won by Nürnberg. The duel between Bayern and Nürnberg is often referred to as the Bavarian Derby.

Bayern also enjoys a strong rivalry with the 1. FC Kaiserslautern, originating in parts from a game in 1973, when Bayern lost 7–4 after leading 4–1, but also from the two clubs competing for German championship honours at various times in the Bundesliga as well as the city of Kaiserslautern together with the surrounding Palatinate having been part of Bavaria until a plebiscite after the end of the Second World War.

Since the 1970s, Bayern's main rivals have been the clubs who put up the strongest fight against its national dominance. In the 1970s this was Borussia Mönchengladbach, in the 1980s the category expanded to include Hamburger SV. In the 1990s, Borussia Dortmund, Werder Bremen and Bayer Leverkusen emerged as the most ardent opponents. Recently Borussia Dortmund, Schalke, and Werder Bremen have been the main challengers in the Bundesliga. Recently, Bayern's main Bundesliga challenger has been Borussia Dortmund. Bayern and Dortmund have competed against each other for many Bundesliga titles. They also have played against each other in the DFB-Pokal final in 2008, 2012, 2014, and 2016. The 2–5 loss against Dortmund in the 2012 final was Bayern's worst ever loss in a DFB-Pokal final. Bayern and Dortmund have also played against each other in the DFL-Supercup in 1989, 2012, 2013, 2014, 2016, 2017, 2019, 2020 and 2022. The height of the competition between the two clubs was when Bayern defeated Dortmund 2–1 in the final of the 2012–13 UEFA Champions League.

Amongst Bayern's chief European rivals are Real Madrid, A.C. Milan, and Manchester United due to many classic wins, draws and losses. Real Madrid versus Bayern is the match that has historically been played most often in the Champions League/European Cup with 26 matches. Due to Bayern being traditionally hard to beat for Madrid, Madrid supporters often refer to Bayern as the "Bestia negra" ("Black Beast"). Despite the number of duels, Bayern and Real have never met in the final of a Champions League or European Cup.

Organization and finance

Bayern is led mostly by former club players. From 2016 to 2019, Uli Hoeneß served as the club's president, following Karl Hopfner who had been in office from 2014; Hoeneß had resigned in 2014 after being convicted of tax fraud. Oliver Kahn is the chairman of the executive board of the AG. The supervisory board of nine consists mostly of managers of big German corporations. Besides the club's president and the board's chairman, they are Herbert Hainer former CEO of (Adidas), Dr. Herbert Diess chairman of (Volkswagen), Dr. Werner Zedelius senior advisor at (Allianz), Timotheus Höttges CEO of (Deutsche Telekom), Prof. Dr. Dieter Mayer, Edmund Stoiber, Theodor Weimer CEO of (Deutsche Börse), and Dr. Michael Diederich speaker of the board at (UniCredit Bank).

Professional football at Bayern is run by the spin-off organisation FC Bayern München AG. AG is short for Aktiengesellschaft, and Bayern is run like a joint stock company, a company whose stock are not listed on the public stock exchange, but is privately owned. 75 per cent of FC Bayern München AG is owned by the club, the FC Bayern München e. V. (e. V. is short for Eingetragener Verein, which translates into "Registered Club"). Three German corporations, the sports goods manufacturer Adidas, the automobile company Audi and the financial services group Allianz each hold 8.33 per cent of the shares, 25 per cent in total. Adidas acquired its shares in 2002 for €77 million. The money was designated to help finance the Allianz Arena. In 2009 Audi paid €90 million for their share. The capital was used to repay the loan on the Allianz Arena. And in early 2014, Allianz became the third shareholder of the company acquiring theirs share for €110 million. With the sale, Bayern paid off the remaining debt on the Allianz Arena 16 years ahead of schedule. Bayern's other sports departments are run by the club.

Bayern's shirt sponsor is Deutsche Telekom. Deutsche Telekom has been Bayern's shirt sponsor since the start of 2002–03 season. The company extended their sponsorship deal in August 2015 until the end of the 2022–23 season. Bayern's kit sponsor is Adidas. Adidas have been Bayern's kit sponsor since 1974. Adidas extended their sponsorship with Bayern on 29 April 2015. The sponsorship deal runs until the end of the 2029–30 season. The premium partners are Audi, Allianz, HypoVereinsbank, Goodyear, Qatar Airways, Siemens, Paulaner Brewery, SAP, DHL, Hamad International Airport and Tipico. Gold sponsors are Coca-Cola, MAN, Procter & Gamble. Classic sponsors are Apple Music, Bayern 3, Beats Electronics, EA Sports, Gigaset, Hugo Boss, Courtyard by Marriott, Veuve Clicquot, and Adelholzener. In previous years the jersey rights were held by Adidas (1974–78), Magirus Deutz and Iveco (1978–84), Commodore (1984–89) and Opel (1989–2002).

Bayern is an exception in professional football, having generated profits for 27 consecutive years. Other clubs often report losses, realising transfers via loans, whereas Bayern always uses current assets. In the 2019 edition of the Deloitte Football Money League, Bayern had the fourth-highest revenue in club football, generating revenue of €629.2 million. Bayern differs from other European top clubs in their income composition. The top 20 European football clubs earned 43 per cent of revenue, on average, from broadcasting rights. Bayern earned the only 28 per cent of their revenue that way. Bayern had the second-highest commercial revenue in the 2019 Deloitte Football Money League, behind only Real Madrid. Bayern's commercial revenue was €348.7 million (55 per cent of total revenue). In contrast, Bayern's Matchday revenue trails other top clubs at €103.8 million (17 per cent of their total revenue).

While other European clubs have mainly marketed to international audiences, Bayern had focused on Germany. In recent years Bayern have started to focus their marketing more on Asia and the United States. Bayern made summer tours to the United States in 2014 and 2016. Bayern went to China in the summer of 2015 and returned in the summer of 2017 where they also played games in Singapore. In August 2014 Bayern opened an office in New York City as the club wants to strengthen their brand positioning against other top European clubs in the United States. In March 2017, Bayern was the first foreign football club to open an office in mainland China. Bayern hope to attract new sponsors and to increase their merchandising sales. In 2017, Forbes ranks Bayern as the world's fourth-most valuable football club in their annual list, estimating the club's value at €2.5 billion.

As a result of Bayern's appearance in the 2012 UEFA Champions League Final, the club's brand value has reached US$786 million, up 59 per cent from the previous year. Among European teams, this is ahead of Real Madrid's US$600 million and behind first-placed Manchester United, whose brand is valued at US$853 million. In 2013, Bayern overtook Manchester United to take first place in brand valuation.

Bayern's financial report for the 2018–19 season reported revenue of €750.4 million and an operating profit of €146.1 million. Post-tax profits were €52.5 million which meant that this was Bayern's 27th consecutive year with a profit.

In 2022, FC Bayern announced the opening of an international office in Bangkok; marking their third such branch office.

Social engagement and charity
Bayern has been involved with charitable ventures for a long time, helping other football clubs in financial disarray as well as ordinary people in misery. In the wake of the 2004 Tsunami the "FC Bayern – Hilfe e.V." was founded, a foundation that aims to concentrate the social engagements of the club. At its inception this venture was funded with €600,000, raised by officials and players of the club. The money was amongst other things used to build a school in Marathenkerny, Sri Lanka and to rebuild the area of Trincomalee, Sri Lanka. In April 2007 it was decided that the focus of the foundation would shift towards supporting people in need locally.

The club has also time and again shown to have a soft spot for clubs in financial disarray. Repeatedly the club has supported its local rival 1860 Munich with gratuitous friendlies, transfers at favourable rates, and direct money transfers. Also when St. Pauli threatened to lose its licence for professional football due to financial problems, Bayern met the club for a friendly game free of any charge, giving all revenues to St. Pauli. More recently when Mark van Bommel's home club Fortuna Sittard was in financial distress Bayern came to a charity game at the Dutch club. Another well known example was the transfer of Alexander Zickler in 1993 from Dynamo Dresden. When Bayern picked up Zickler for 2.3 Million DM many considered the sum to be a subvention for the financially threatened Dresdeners. In 2003, Bayern provided a €2 Million loan without collateral to the nearly bankrupt Borussia Dortmund which has since been repaid. On 14 July 2013, Bayern played a charity game against financially threatened third division Hansa Rostock. The game raised about €1 million, securing Hansa's licence. On 30 August 2017, Bayern played a benefit match against financial troubled Kickers Offenbach. All the revenue from the match went to Kickers Offenbach. Bayern's chairman, Karl-Heinz Rummenigge said, "Kickers Offenbach are a club with a rich tradition, they've always been an important club in Germany, so we'll gladly help them with a benefit match." On 27 May 2019, Bayern played a benefit match against 1. FC Kaiserslautern. The match was played so Kaiserslautern could secure their licence to play in the German third division. All income from the match went to Kaiserslautern. "1. FC Kaiserslautern are one of Germany's biggest traditional clubs," Bayern's chairman, Karl-Heinz Rummenigge said. "For many years there were intense, and in retrospect also legendary, Bayern matches at Kaiserslautern. Football is all about emotions and sporting rivalries, but also about solidarity. That's why we're happy to help and hope 1. FC Kaiserslautern can once again gain promotion back to the Bundesliga in the foreseeable future."

In March 2020, Bayern Munich, Borussia Dortmund, RB Leipzig, and Bayer Leverkusen, the four German UEFA Champions League teams for the 2019/20 season, collectively gave €20 million to Bundesliga and 2. Bundesliga teams that were struggling financially during the COVID-19 pandemic.

In mid 2013, Bayern was the first club to give financial support to the Magnus Hirschfeld National Foundation. The foundation researches the living environment LGBT people, and developed an education concept to facilitate unbiased dealing with LGBT themes in football.

In 2016, FC Bayern received the Nine Values Cup, an award of the international children's social programme Football for Friendship.

Training facility

FC Bayern Munich headquarters and training facility is called Säbener Straße and it is located in the Untergiesing-Harlaching borough of Munich. The first team and the reserve team train at the facility. There are five grass pitches, two of which have undersoil heating, two artificial grass fields, a beach volleyball court and a multi-functional sports hall.

The players' quarters opened in 1990 and were reconstructed after the 2007–08 season on suggestions by then new coach, Jürgen Klinsmann, who took inspiration from various major sports clubs. The quarters are now called the performance centre and feature weights and fitness areas, a massage unit, dressing rooms, the coaches' office, and a conference room with screening facilities for video analysis. A café, a library, an e-Learning room, and a family room are also included.

Until August 2017, the Youth House was located at the headquarters at Säbener Straße. The Youth House housed up to 14 young talents aged 15 to 18 from outside of Munich. Former residents of the Youth House include Bastian Schweinsteiger, David Alaba, Owen Hargreaves, Michael Rensing, Holger Badstuber and Emre Can.

In 2006, Bayern purchased land near the Allianz Arena with the purpose of building a new youth academy. In 2015 the project, estimated to cost €70 million, was started after overcoming internal resistance. The project's main reasons were that the existing facilities were too small and that the club, while very successful at the senior level, lacked competitiveness with other German and European clubs at the youth level. The new facility was scheduled to open in the 2017–18 season. On 21 August 2017 the FC Bayern Campus opened at a cost of €70 million. The campus is located north of Munich at Ingolstädter Straße. The campus is 30 hectare and has 8 football pitches for youth teams from the U-9s to the U-19s and the women's and girls' teams. The campus also has a 2,500-capacity stadium where the U-17s and the U-19s play their matches. The Allianz FC Bayern Akademie is located on the campus site, and the academy has 35 apartments for young talents who don't live in the Greater Munich area. The academy building also has offices for youth coaches and staff.

Honours

Bayern is historically the most successful team in German football, as they have won the most championships and the most cups. They are also Germany's most successful team in international competitions, having won fourteen trophies. Bayern is the only club to have won all three major European competitions, have won three consecutive European Cups and won the treble twice, one of which was part of the larger and more elusive "sextuple" (2020).

 
  shared record

Trebles
Bayern Munich has completed all available Trebles (seasonal treble, domestic treble and European treble).
 Treble
 Seasonal treble (Bundesliga, DFB-Pokal, UEFA Champions League)
 2012–13, 2019–20
 European treble (UEFA Cup Winners' Cup, European Cup, UEFA Cup)
 1966–67 European Cup Winners' Cup, 1973–74 European Cup, 1995–96 UEFA Cup
 Domestic treble (Bundesliga, DFB-Pokal, DFL-Ligapokal)
 1999–2000

The football competitions, which consist of a single match involving only two teams (for example, the UEFA Super Cup or DFL Supercup) are generally not counted as part of a treble but are included in a sextuple.

Sextuple
During each calendar year, Bayern Munich only have 6 trophies available to them. A sextuple consists of going "6 for 6" in those competitions, which Bayern accomplished in 2020. This rare feat consists of winning the Continental treble in one season followed by winning each of the three additional competitions to which the treble gives a club access in the following season.
 2020 Sextuple
 2019–20 season
 2019–20 Bundesliga
 2019–20 DFB-Pokal
 2019–20 UEFA Champions League
 2020–21 season
 2020 DFL-Supercup
 2020 UEFA Super Cup
 2020 FIFA Club World Cup

Players

Current squad

Out on loan

Retired numbers

 12 – "The twelfth man", dedication to fans

Notable past players

At his farewell game, Oliver Kahn was declared honorary captain of Bayern Munich. The players below are part of the FC Bayern Munich Hall of Fame.

1930s
  Conrad Heidkamp (DF)

1970s:
  Franz Beckenbauer (DF)
  Gerd Müller (FW)
  Uli Hoeneß (FW)
  Paul Breitner (MF)
  Sepp Maier (GK)
  Hans-Georg Schwarzenbeck (DF)
  Franz Roth (MF)

1980s:
  Karl-Heinz Rummenigge (FW)
  Klaus Augenthaler (DF)

1990s:
  Lothar Matthäus (MF/DF)
  Stefan Effenberg (MF)

2000s:
  Oliver Kahn (GK)
  Mehmet Scholl (MF)
  Bixente Lizarazu (DF)
  Giovane Élber (FW)

2010s:
  Philipp Lahm (DF)
  Bastian Schweinsteiger (MF)

Captains

Coaches

Current staff

Coaches since 1963
Bayern has had 19 coaches since its promotion to the Bundesliga in 1965. Udo Lattek, Giovanni Trapattoni and Ottmar Hitzfeld served two terms as head coach. Franz Beckenbauer served one term as head coach and one as caretaker, while Jupp Heynckes had four separate spells as coach, including one as caretaker. Lattek was the club's most successful coach, having won six Bundesliga titles, two DFB Cups and the European Cup; following closely is Ottmar Hitzfeld, who won five Bundesliga titles, two DFB Cups and the Champions League. The club's least successful coach was Søren Lerby, who won less than a third of his matches in charge and presided over the club's near-relegation in the 1991–92 campaign.

On 3 November 2019, Bayern sacked Niko Kovač after a 5–1 loss to Eintracht Frankfurt and appointed Hansi Flick as a coach. Initially, Flick was installed as caretaker coach only, however on 15 November, after Flick's team had won 4–0 against Borussia Dortmund, Bayern announced that Flick would be in charge at least until Christmas 2019. Later on, Flick signed a new contract until 2023.

Club management

FC Bayern München AG

FC Bayern München e.V.

Other departments

Football

Reserve team

The reserve team serves mainly as the final stepping stone for promising young players before being promoted to the main team. The second team is coached by Sebastian Hoeneß. The second team play in the 3. Liga for the 2019–20 season. Since the inception of the Regionalliga in 1994, the team played in the Regionalliga Süd, after playing in the Oberliga since 1978. In the 2007–08 season, they qualified for the newly founded 3. Liga, where they lasted until 2011 when they were relegated to the Regionalliga. This ended 33 consecutive years of playing in the highest league that the German Football Association permits the second team of a professional football team to play.

Junior teams

The youth academy has produced some of Europe's top football players, including Thomas Hitzlsperger, Owen Hargreaves, Philipp Lahm, Bastian Schweinsteiger and Thomas Müller. On 1 August 2017, the FC Bayern Campus became the new home of the youth teams. It consists of ten teams, with the youngest being under 9. Jochen Sauer is the FC Bayern Campus director and Bayern legend coach Hermann Gerland is the sporting director.

Women's team

The women's football department consists of five teams, including a professional team, a reserve team, and two youth teams. The women's first team, which is led by head coach Thomas Wörle, features several members of the German national youth team. In the 2008–09 season, the team finished second in the women's Bundesliga. The division was founded in 1970 and consisted of four teams with 90 players. Their greatest successes were winning the championships in 1976, 2015, and 2016. In the 2011–12 season on 12 May 2012, FC Bayern Munich dethroned the German Cup title holders 1. FFC Frankfurt with a 2–0 in the 2011–12 final in Cologne and celebrated the biggest success of the club's history since winning the championship in 1976. In 2015 they won the Bundesliga for the first time, without any defeat. They won the 2015–16 Bundesliga for the second consecutive time.

Senior football
The senior football department was founded in 2002, making it the youngest division of the club, and consists of five teams. The division is intended to enable senior athletes to participate in the various senior citizen competitions in Munich.

AllStars
The FC Bayern AllStars were founded in summer 2006, and consists of former Bayern players, including Klaus Augenthaler, Raimond Aumann, Andreas Brehme, Paul Breitner, Hans Pflügler, Stefan Reuter, Paulo Sérgio, and Olaf Thon. The team is coached by Wolfgang Dremmler, and plays matches with other senior teams around the world. For organisational reasons, the team can only play a limited number of games annually.

Other sports
Bayern has other departments for a variety of sports.

Basketball

The basketball department was founded in 1946, and currently contains 26 teams, including four men's teams, three women's teams, sixteen youth teams, and three senior teams. The men's team are five-time German champions, having won in 1954, 1955, 2014, 2018, and 2019. The team also won the German Basketball Cup in 1968, 2018, and 2021. The team plays its home games at the Rudi-Sedlmayer-Halle, located in the Sendling-Westpark borough of Munich.

Bowling
The bowling department emerged from SKC Real-Isaria in 1983 and currently consists of five teams. Directly next to the well-known club building of the football department, the team plays at the bowling alley of the Münchner Kegler-Verein. The first team plays in the second highest division of the Münchner Spielklasse Bezirksliga.

Chess
The department was created in 1908 and consists of nine teams, including seven men's teams and two women's teams. The men's team, which currently plays in the Chess Bundesliga following promotion in 2013 from the 2. Bundesliga Ost, was nine-time German Champion from 1983 to 1995. The team also won the European Chess Club Cup in 1992. The women currently play in the 2. Bundesliga with their biggest successes being promotion to the Frauenbundesliga in 2016 and 2018.

Handball

The handball department was founded in 1945, and consists of thirteen teams, including three men's teams, two women's teams, five boys teams, two girls teams, and a mixed youth team. The first men's team plays in the Bezirksoberliga Oberbayern, while the women's first teams plays in the Bezirksliga Oberbayern.

Referees
The refereeing department was established in 1919 and is currently the largest football refereeing division in Europe, with 110 referees, with 2 of them women. The referees mainly officiate amateur games in the local Munich leagues.

Table tennis
The table tennis department was founded in 1946 and currently has 220 members. The club currently has fourteen teams, including eight men's teams, a women's team, three youth teams, and two children teams. The women's first team is currently playing in the Landesliga Süd/Ost, while the men's first team plays in the 3. Bundesliga Süd. The focus of the department is on youth support.

Defunct

Baseball
The baseball division existed during the 1960s and 1970s, during which the team won two German championships in 1962 and 1969.

Ice hockey
From 1966 to 1969, Bayern had an ice hockey team, which completed two seasons in the Eishockey-Bundesliga.

In the summer of 1965, the Münchner Eislauf Verein negotiated with Bayern Munich about joining the club. Although the talks came to nothing, the ice hockey department of Münchner Eislauf Verein decided to join Bayern –mid-season– in January 1966. The team finished the season under the name of Bayern Munich in third place of the second-tier Oberliga. The following season Bayern achieved promotion to the Bundesliga where the club stayed for two seasons. However, in 1969 the club disbanded the department and sold the hockey team to Augsburger EV, citing lack of local support and difficulty in recruiting players as reasons.

Gymnastics
The gymnastics department was founded in 1974 and was most successful in the 1980s. During this time, the team won four German championships in 1983, 1986, 1987, and 1988. In 2014, the division was dissolved.

Literature
 Hüetlin, Thomas: Gute Freunde. Die wahre Geschichte des FC Bayern München. Blessing, München 2006, .
 Schulze-Marmeling, Dietrich: Der FC Bayern und seine Juden. Aufstieg und Zerschlagung einer liberalen Fußballkultur. Verlag Die Werkstatt, Göttingen 2011, .
 Bausenwein, Christoph, Schulze-Marmeling, Dietrich: FC Bayern München. Unser Verein, unsere Geschichte. Verlag Die Werkstatt, Göttingen 2012, .

Notes

References

External links

  (German, Japanese, Spanish, Chinese, Russian, and Arabic versions also available)
 Yearly record in the Bundesliga (archived)

 
Football clubs in Germany
Football clubs in Munich
Association football clubs established in 1900
Multi-sport clubs in Germany
G-14 clubs
1900 establishments in Bavaria
Bayern
B
B
B
B
M
Bundesliga clubs